Hope International FC is a professional football club based in Kingstown, St Vincent and the Grenadines. They currently play in the NLA Premier League. They finished third in the inaugural season of the Saint Vincent and the Grenadines National Championship, now the NLA Premier League.

Current squad

Achievements
NLA Premier League: 4
2004, 2006, 2015, 2020

References

External links
St. Vincent and the Grenadines Football Federation

Football clubs in Saint Vincent and the Grenadines
1995 establishments in Saint Vincent and the Grenadines
Association football clubs established in 1995